Prolita pagella is a moth of the family Gelechiidae. It was described by Ronald W. Hodges in 1966. It is found in North America, where it has been recorded from Arizona, California, Wyoming and Colorado.

The wingspan is 17–19 mm. The forewings are orange brown and varying shades of brown. The hindwings are fuscous with dark veins.

References

Moths described in 1966
Prolita